Oduncu (literally "woodcutter", "timberman") is a Turkish occupational surname and may refer to:
 Fuat Oduncu (born 1970), German hematologist
 Mehmet Oduncu (born 1962), Turkish civil servant
 Velican Oduncu (1963–1988), Turkish Grey Wolves member and murder victim

Occupational surnames
Turkish-language surnames